Neurogomphus featheri is a species of dragonfly in the family Gomphidae. It is found in Chad, Gambia, Kenya, Nigeria, and Uganda. Its natural habitats are subtropical or tropical moist lowland forests, moist savanna, subtropical or tropical dry shrubland, subtropical or tropical moist shrubland, and rivers.

References

Gomphidae
Taxonomy articles created by Polbot
Insects described in 1967